El Chicano is a 2018 American superhero film directed by Ben Hernandez Bray, who co-wrote the screenplay with Joe Carnahan. It stars Raúl Castillo, Aimee Garcia, and George Lopez. The film has been called the "first Latino superhero movie". It premiered in September 2018 at the Los Angeles Film Festival and was released in the United States on May 3, 2019.
Frank Grillo and Lorenzo di Bonaventura served as executive producers.

Plot
Growing up in East Los Angeles, California twin brothers Diego and Pedro, along with their friend José, hear stories of a legend called El Chicano, a vigilante who defends the streets of LA by eliminating gangsters and other criminals. After dropping off José at his house, he receives a beating from his mother. El Chicano shows up later and kills José's father called "Shadow", a wheelchair-using shot caller for his gang. Afterwards, he sees Diego and Pedro and then rides off in the night.

Years later Diego is now an LAPD detective, Pedro is dead presumably by suicide, and José is now a gang leader who goes by his street name Shotgun. Diego, alongside his partner David investigates a crime scene where Shotgun's gang has been murdered except for one member, Silent. Diego and David pick him up for questioning, but he is executed during the drive. Diego goes to Shotgun for answers, but he evades the questions and taunts Diego uses by bringing up the abuse from his mother. Diego looks for answers from Pedro's old belongings and realizes Pedro was changing, wanting revolution, and justice for Los Angeles.

Diego goes to his only trusted confidant, Father Jesus, who mentions Pedro changed after being released from prison and how he got involved with Shotgun and another member Diego has yet to identify. Diego is further surprised when he finds a hidden storage unit Pedro rented and that he had begun to resurrect the mantle of El Chicano before his death. Diego and David later stake out a party held by Shotgun but are ambushed, resulting in Diego being injured and David dying. Ordered to recover by Captain Gomez, Diego has his mom and girlfriend leave for a while until everything is settled.

Frustrated and angry about the deaths of David and Pedro, alongside Shotgun's involvement, he visits Father Jesus' church once again where he takes Jesus' prized Tecpatl knife and finishes the El Chicano costume, ready to take revenge.

Diego tracks down Shotgun at a club and fights his bodyguards. Shotgun escapes along with Jaws, who is revealed to be the other gang member who knew Pedro, while also being the son of an infamous cartel leader who is interested in taking over LA. Shotgun kills Jaws during the escape and pins the blame on El Chicano for his plans to move forward. El Gallo, Jaws' father, hears the news and swears vengeance on both El Chicano and the police.

A still injured Diego retreats home to tend to his wounds, but is suspected of involvement by Captain Gomez when Diego's wound on his leg begins to bleed. Diego learns later that Gomez and his officers have been kidnapped by El Gallo, who broadcasts his plans of execution on the internet, unless El Chicano comes to him. Diego goes after in saving the missing cops, kills the cartel members by working alongside the police officers he rescued, and finishes El Gallo as well. Finally having no more distractions, he now has the chance to go after Shotgun.

Diego chases him to a cemetery where the two fight with Shotgun wanting revenge for what happened to Shadow and Diego punishing Shotgun for everything he did to Diego's family for Pedro's death. After a brutal fight, Diego lands the killing blow to Shotgun through the knife, and then removes his mask in front of Shotgun reciting the words Pedro left behind, 'Know Thay Enemy'.

Diego having sustained multiple injures and blood loss, passes out. He awakes later recovering from his injures, while having learned Gomez found him first, before the police arrived at the scene and saved him from being arrested, wanting to keep his best cop investigator from being identified as the vigilante. Back in Mexico, El Gallo's wife, La Hembra has now become the new leader of his crew and swears revenge on El Chicano. Back in LA, Diego now has accepted the El Chicano mantle and made peace with Pedro, seeing his spirit before, wanting to do him and his home proud by keeping it safe from the cartel invaders and all who come.

Cast
Raúl Castillo as Pedro Hernandez / Diego Hernandez / El Chicano
Aimee Garcia as Vanessa Velez
Jose Pablo Cantillo as Detective Martinez
David Castañeda as Shotgun
Marco Rodríguez as Jesus Salvas 
Sal Lopez as El Gallo
Marlene Forte as Susana
Kate Del Castillo as La Hembra
George Lopez as Captain Gomez
Emilio Rivera as "Shadow"

Production
The script began as Bray's memoir about the death of his brother, who had been involved with gangs, but Bray turned the memoir into a story about a fictional vigilante named "El Chicano". Carnahan and Bray then completed the script in a four-week collaborative writing session at Carnahan's home near Palm Springs. They pitched the script for El Chicano in 2017, but interested studios expressed concerns about the all-Latino cast, and ultimately passed on the film. The pair found new investors from the oil and gas industry who partnered with Carnahan and Frank Grillo's production company WarParty Films to produce El Chicano. The film was mostly shot in Calgary. Following the film's premiere at the LA Film Festival, Briarcliff Entertainment acquired U.S. distribution rights.

Reception

Critical response
The website's critic consensus reads: "El Chicano represents a step forward for representation in superhero cinema -- unfortunately, its clichéd story is nothing more than ordinary." On Metacritic, the film has a weighted average score of 46 out of 100, based on reviews by 13 critics, indicating "mixed or average reviews".

The Hollywood Reporter praised the cast, including Castillo's "charismatic performance in the lead role" and the "vivid impressions" left by Marlene Forte and Aimee Garcia. The Los Angeles Times positively noted the more inclusive take on "Hollywood cop movies from the '80s, when masculinity came only in a macho shade", but also criticized the film's portrayal of Mexican nationals as "demonized, criminal, carnage-friendly, nationalist invaders". Writing for TheWrap, critic Monica Castillo similarly drew attention to the "fear-mongering cartel tropes" that failed to "undo the damage of hateful rhetoric aimed at Latin American people". In discussing the film's violence, the San Francisco Chronicle observed that "these blurry, hurried scenes are among the most frustrating elements in a largely disappointing movie", while The New York Times noted that its "political and thematic purpose" was unclear.

Accolades
 Best Feature Film, Maryland International Film Festival

References

External links

2018 films
2010s superhero films
Films set in Los Angeles
Films shot in Calgary
American superhero films
2010s English-language films
Hood films
Films with screenplays by Joe Carnahan
Films produced by Joe Carnahan
2010s American films